La Tavola Ritonda (The Round Table) is a  15th-century Italian Arthurian romance written in the medieval Tuscan language. It is preserved in a 1446 manuscript at the Biblioteca Nazionale Centrale in Florence (Codex Palatinus 556). It was translated into English as Tristan and the Round Table by Anne Shaver in 1983.

Footnotes

External links
 (Internet Archive)

1446 books
15th-century manuscripts
Arthurian literature
Romance (genre)